Jowan Le Besco is a director, cinematographer, screenwriter, editor and actor Franco-Algerian born on 26 August 1981.

Family 
Le Besco was born to a Franco-Algerian mother, the actress Catherine Belkhodja, and Patrick Le Besco, a linguist specializing in the Breton language. His maternal grandfather, Abdelkader Belkhodja, a former FLN moudjahid based in France, was then in charge of emigration at the Ministry of Labor from 1965 to 1972, then at the Ministry of Former Moudjahidines until 1975 (Algeri)); his grandmother, Jeanne Mauborgne, a nurse and then a social worker, was, like her husband, a very active communist activist. He is the brother of two directors and actresses, Maïwenn and Isild Le Besco; he also has a third sister, Leonor Graser, and a brother, Kolia Litscher.

Career 
Jowan Le Besco shoots his first professional film as director of photography, with Demi-tarif released in 2004 and directed by his younger sister Isild Le Besco. The film won many awards in France and internationally and allowed them to produce the next film of Isild Le Besco: Charly (2006). He then worked with directors and cinematographers such as Caroline Champetier, Romain Winding, Claire Mathon, Benoît Jacquot or Emmanuelle Bercot. At the same time as shooting, he followed training courses at the École nationale supérieure Institut Louis Lumière and the École de l'Image Les Gobelins. In 2006, he wrote and directed his first feature film, Yapo (documentary filmed in India, in the Sikkim region) which earned it a selection at the 29th edition of the Cinéma du Réel Festival. The film, in a shorter version, will be broadcast in 2008 on the television channel Arte, in the prestigious slot dedicated to documentary La Lucarne, under the name Les béquilles du Lama Yapo.

Jowan Le Besco has worked as a director of photography and cameraman for films such as Polisse, Mon roi, Connemara, Lomepal: 3 jours à Motorbass, Les Deux Amis, L'Intouchable, Bas-fonds, La Belle Occasion, Confinés. He also works regularly in the field of music and performing arts, notably as a director and cinematographer: the Opéra National de Paris, Pédro Kouyaté, the Orchestre national de Barbès, Tartit, Bania, Farees, Ghassen Fendri, Senny Camara.

Filmography

Cinematographer

Feature films 
 2004: Demi-tarif by Isild Le Besco
 2007: Charly by Isild Le Besco
 2007: Childhoods coproduced by Safy Nebbou, Isild Le Besco, Joana Hadjithomas and Khalil Joreige, Corinne Garfin, Ismaël Ferroukhi and Yann Le Gal
 2008: Bas-Fonds by Isild Le Besco
 2013: Manhattan Romance by Haik Kocharian
 2014: Little boy (short), in the choral film Bridges of Sarajevo
 2017: La Belle Occasion by Isild Le Besco  
 2020: Confinés by Isild Le Besco
 2021: Connemara by Isild Le Besco

Cameraman

Feature films 
 2006: L'Intouchable by Benoît Jacquot
 2006: Gaspard le Bandit by Benoît Jacquot
 2010: Polisse by Maïwenn
 2015: Mon roi by Maïwenn
 2015: Les Deux Amis by Louis Garrel
 2019: Lomepal - 3 jours à Motobass by Christophe Charrier

Writer, director, cinematographer, editor

Documentary 
 2007 : Yapo (présenté au Festival Cinéma du réel), by Jowan Le Besco
 2008 : Les béquilles du Lama Yapo (Arte-La Lucarne), by Jowan Le Besco
 2011: On va à Cannes !!! (Le Making of de Polisse) by Jowan Le Besco and Douglas Attal

Fiction 
 2002: Narada

Actor

Cinema 
 1999: La Puce by Emmanuelle Bercot 
 2002: Un moment de bonheur by Antoine Santana with Isild Le Besco
 2011: I am Kalam by Nila Nadhab Panda

Television 
1989: The Owl's Legacy by Chris Marker
 2004 : Princesse Marie by Benoît Jacquot, Pierre de Grèce

Other

Feature films 
 2002: Mods by Serge Bozon (1st assistant director)
 2004: À tout de suite by Benoît Jacquot (Making of)
 2006: L'Intouchable by Benoît Jacquot (1st assistant director)

Short films 
 2009: Some kinda fuckery by Nadia Szold  (Cinematographer)
 2014: *Me There de Majaajyia Silberfeld  (Cinematographer)
 2019: 22 Min  d'Isild Le Besco (Cinematographer)
 2020: En mon cœur by Isild Le Besco (Cinematographer)
 2020: Independence # D, Farees  (Cinematographer)
 2021: Foudroyer en bien  by Isild Le Besco (Cinematographer)
 2022: Le viol du pouvoir  by Deborah De Robertis (Cinematographer)

Theater 
 2004 : Le Pois chiche de et avec Maïwenn au Café de la Gare (captation)

Awards and recognition 
 2000 : Junior prize for best screenplay at the Paris Film Festival for her first screenplay: Demi-tarif
 2004 : Special Jury Prize at the European First Film festival of Angers for Demi-tarif
 2004 : Procirep Prize Premiers plans. Angers for Demi-tarif
 2004 : Special Jury Prize at the Seoul International Women's Film Festival for Demi-tarif
 2004 : Nominated for the award Louis Deluc for Demi-Tarif
 2005 : Grand Prize of the Jury Crossing Europe Festival Linz for Demi-tarif
 2007 : Selection at the Festival Cinéma du Réel pour Les Béquilles du Lama Yapo

References

External links
 https://www.lemonde.fr/vous/article/2008/05/16/les-bequilles-du-lama-yapo_1045749_3238.html
 https://vieillecarne.com/les-bequilles-du-lama-yapo-le-temps-suspendu/
 Yapo Film de Jowan Le Besco sur Tamasa Distribution  
 https://www.centrepompidou.fr/fr/programme/agenda/evenement/c6epbX

1981 births
Living people
University of Paris alumni
French male film actors
French people of Algerian descent
French people of Breton descent
French people of Vietnamese descent
Male actors from Paris